Danny Webb (born 6 June 1958) is an English television and film actor. He is best known for his roles as the prisoner Morse in the movie Alien 3, Thomas Cromwell in Henry VIII and as John Maynard Jefferson in the two part Doctor Who story The Impossible Planet and The Satan Pit in 2006.

Early life
Webb was born on 6 June 1958 to Eileen and Maurice Webb. He attended The Royal Academy of Dramatic Art and graduated in 1977.

Career
Webb has appeared in many British television programmes, including The Young Indiana Jones Chronicles, Our Friends in the North, A Touch of Frost, Agatha Christie's Poirot, The Bill, Midsomer Murders, Silent Witness and Shackleton. He also starred in two episodes of Doctor Who - "The Impossible Planet" and "The Satan Pit", alongside lead actors David Tennant and Billie Piper. He has also starred in Britannia High as Jack Tyler and in New Tricks as a DJ.

In 1985 Webb starred alongside Jon Pertwee in a television adaptation of Karl Wittlinger's Broadway play, Do You Know the Milky Way? playing Kris, a psychiatric patient who believed that he came from another star.

Webb has also had recurring roles in several television series, including Brookside, Cardiac Arrest and Life Begins. He also had a role in Honest, playing Mack Carter.

Webb also appeared in the video for the song "Owner of a Lonely Heart" by the band Yes.

In 2008 Webb appeared as the journalist Noel Botham in the BBC Four drama Hughie Green, Most Sincerely, as well as narrating the Games Workshop Black Library audiobook The Lightning Tower/The Dark King and the Gotrek and Felix audiobook Slayer of the Storm God. He also had a small part as a German communications officer in the film Valkyrie starring Tom Cruise.

In September 2009 he had a lead role in the BBC1 five-part drama series Land Girls, playing a sergeant in the Home Guard.

Webb also appeared in Hustle, as Shaun and Emma's father, in 2010, and has played Kevin Dalton in the BBC drama Holby City.

In 2015 Danny completed the role of Roy in the British crime thriller The Contract which was released in January 2016.

Theatre work
Danny Webb has worked extensively in theatre, including in the Olivier Award-winning production of Blasted by Sarah Kane at the Lyric Theatre in 2011. He also won Best Actor for the role in the Off West End Awards. He has appeared twice at the Royal Court Theatre, in Chicken Soup with Barley by Arnold Wesker (2011) and The Mistress Contract. In 2022, he appeared as Al Smith in Straight Line Crazy in London and Off-Broadway.

Films

Television

References

External links
 

1958 births
English male film actors
English male television actors
Living people
Male actors from London